Cahan may refer to:

 Cahan (surname)
 Cahan, Orne, a commune of the Orne département in France

See also 
 O'Cahan, a clan in Ulster
 Kahan (disambiguation)
 Kagan (disambiguation) 
 Kaganovich (disambiguation)